Beach bum or beach bums may refer to:
 A beach bum or a surf bum
 The Beach Bum, a 2019 American stoner comedy film
 The San Pedro Beach Bums, a 1977 television series
 Traverse City Beach Bums,  a professional baseball team based in the Traverse City, Michigan
 Beach bum trust provision, a provision in the law of trusts to prevent a beneficiary from lazily living off the trust funds
 Beach Bum Survey, a study on the prevalence of antibiotic-resistant E. coli in surfers and bodyboarders supported by Surfers Against Sewage

See also
 Beach bunny (disambiguation)